PGCC may mean:
 Cooperation Council for the Arab States of the Gulf, the Persian Gulf Cooperation Council
 Pentium GCC
 Prince George's Community College
 Penang Global City Centre